"Give Up the Funk (Tear the Roof off the Sucker)" is a funk song by Parliament. It was released as a single under the name "Tear the Roof off the Sucker (Give Up the Funk)". It was the second single to be released from Parliament's 1975 album Mothership Connection (following "P. Funk (Wants to Get Funked Up)").  With its anthemic sing-along chorus, it is one of the most famous P-Funk songs. It also became Parliament's first certified million-selling single, going Gold in 1976.

The bass vocal at the beginning of the song is performed by Ray Davis.

Single version
The single version begins without the "tear the roof off the sucker" intro.

Analysis
The song is constructed using a jazz-influenced form. Three themes are stated at the beginning of the track:
A – "You've got a real type of thing" (usually using a syncopated bass line)
B – "We want the funk" (a chorus of sorts; the bass is usually a near-double of the vocals)
C – "La la la" (bass as in B-Theme)
The three themes are stated briefly twice (8 bars each section), followed by a short (4-bar) break ("D"). With this exposition complete, Parliament explores each theme with greater interpretive freedom (beginning at 2:18). The A-Theme elaboration takes only 16 bars, after which the B-Theme is elaborated upon for 56 bars. During this elaboration, two new ideas are combined with the B-Theme (subthemes D and E):
D – "We're gonna turn this mother out"
E – "Let us in we'll turn this mother out"
The three main themes are rarely layered on top of each other. The C-Theme elaboration lasts only 8 bars, and is interpolated with the A-Theme (for 2 bars). With this development section complete, the three main themes are recapitulated (beginning at 5:18). A fadeout during this recapitulation ends the song with the B-Theme.

Aside from the song's form, another jazz-like element is the degree of interactivity among the musicians. The bass frequently responds to vocal gestures, and the bass and synthesizer frequently interact. Likewise, the drums interact with the pitched lines.

Two main contrasting vocal timbres are heard in this song. The "norm" (used in themes A, B and D) is a throaty, loud timbre with casual enunciation and somewhat microtonal/bent pitches. An "alternative" timbre (found in themes C and E) uses a mannered exaggerated enunciation, with very clear pitches.

As with many of Parliament's songs, a full ensemble sound is obtained using few players; the song relies mainly on bass guitar, one synthesizer, and a drum kit. (Guitar, synthesizer pad, and brass are heard subtly.) Many different vocal ensembles are found, most occurring in groups.

Chart performance
"Give Up the Funk (Tear the Roof off the Sucker)" was the highest-charting single from the album, reaching number five on the Billboard Hot Soul Singles chart and number fifteen on the Billboard Hot 100 pop singles chart.

Appearances in media

"Give Up the Funk (Tear the Roof off the Sucker)" has been heard in a number of movies, including the opening and closing scenes of the 2002 film Undercover Brother, in which the '70s-inspired protagonist, played by Eddie Griffin, drives around in a classic Cadillac. In the 2006 film Click, Adam Sandler's character sings the song while dancing. "Give Up the Funk" also appears in the salon renovation scene of the 2005 film Beauty Shop, the 1998 film Slums of Beverly Hills, the 2008 film Cloverfield and in the 2011 film Moneyball. It is also performed by Clinton and P-Funk in the 1994 film PCU. It is also used in the HBO Max show Station Eleven.

"Give Up the Funk (Tear the Roof off the Sucker)" has also been used in a number of TV commercials, including the Jack in the Box restaurant chain, Moro Nuts, MasterCard's 2007 "Back to School" campaign, Pringles Potato Chips (2010), 2006 ads for the Honda Odyssey, and sampled lyrics for a Church's Chicken commercial.

The Brazilian comedy group Hermes & Renato started using this song in 1999 for its sketches, when the character "Joselito" appears.

This song is parodied by The Mighty Boosh in the 2005 episode "The Legend of Old Gregg" where Parliament is centric to the episode's plot.

The song is parodied in The Proud Family in the 2005 episode "She Drives Me Crazy", where the character Bobby Proud performs the song "Bobby's Jam: So Dysfunkshunal" with his band DisFunkshunal Junction, a clear parody of P-Funk.

The song is performed in the 2010 episode of the hit television series Glee, "Funk", by the entire cast.

"Give Up the Funk" appears throughout the 2012 episode "Charlie's Mom Has Cancer" from the eighth season of It's Always Sunny in Philadelphia. It first appears when the Gang go to visit Dr. Jinx (Puff Daddy). He is listening to it in his home/garage/doctor's office, then plays the main melody on a bass guitar when Dennis asks him if he "has anything that could cause him to have feelings again". Finally, Dr. Jinx's band, Dr. Jinx, is seen performing near the end of the episode at the Gang's "Beef, Beer & Jesus" benefit for Charlie's mom at Paddy's Pub.

"Give Up the Funk" appears in the opening scene of the 2016 film The Purge: Election Year.

The song is one of six songs Rocket Raccoon plays off of Peter Quill's Walkman when breaking the Guardians of the Galaxy out of the Collector's Fortress (Guardians of the Galaxy – Mission: Breakout!) at Disney California Adventure.

Samples and covers
The phrase "turn those mothers out" is sung repeatedly in the bridge to the 1990 song "Flovilla Thatch vs. The Virile Garbageman" by American ska-funk rock band the Cherry Poppin' Daddies. This was an intentional homage to Parliament.

In 1991, Ecuadorian rapper Gerardo Mejía sampled the chorus from "We Want The Funk", on the album "Mo Ritmo", adding rap lyrics.  It peaked at #16 on the Billboard Hot 100. 

Compton Rapper Tweedy Bird Loc edited the intro & used it as an intro itself in his hit song "Coming Out The Cage" on his 1992 debut album '187 Ride By'.

The 1993 song "Who Am I? (Whats My Name?)" by West Coast Hip-Hop artist Snoop Doggy Dogg features female vocalists recreating the "La la la" section. Indeed, many of the tracks from Snoop's debut 1993 album Doggystyle and many of the early production works from Dr. Dre either sampled or recreated parts of many tracks from Parliament and its sister act Funkadelic.

The song is one of many cover songs the accordion-based comedy rock band Those Darn Accordions have performed live.

The phrase "...turn this mother out" from Parliament's "Give Up the Funk (Tear the Roof Off the Sucker)" is repeated in the bridge of MC Hammer's song "Turn This Mutha' Out" released on his 1988 album "Let's Get It Started".

References

Parliament (band) songs
1975 songs
1976 singles
Songs written by George Clinton (funk musician)
Funk songs
Casablanca Records singles
Songs written by Bootsy Collins